The 1978–79 Bulgarian Cup was the 39th season of the Bulgarian Cup (in this period the tournament was named Cup of the Soviet Army). Levski Sofia won the competition, beating Beroe Stara Zagora 4–1 in the final at the Vasil Levski National Stadium.

First round

|-
!colspan=3 style="background-color:#D0F0C0;" |9–10 December 1978

|}

Second round

|-
!colspan=3 style="background-color:#D0F0C0;" |16 December 1978

|}

Third round

Quarter-finals

Semi-finals

Third place play-off

|-
!colspan=4 style="background-color:#D0F0C0;" |1979

|}

Final

Details

References

1978-79
1978–79 domestic association football cups
Cup